The Alceu is a left tributary of the river Crișul Repede in Romania. It discharges into the Crișul Repede in Toboliu.

References

Rivers of Romania
Rivers of Bihor County